Anari may refer to:

Films 
 Anari (1959 film), a Bollywood film directed by Hrishikesh Mukherjee
 Anari (1975 film), a Bollywood film directed by Asit Sen, starring Shashi Kapoor, Sharmila Tagore and Moushumi Chatterjee
 Anari (1993 film), a Hindi film directed by K. Muralimohana Rao and starring Karishma Kapoor and Venkatesh

Places 
 Anari, Iranshahr, Sistan and Baluchestan Province, Iran
 Anari River, a river of Rondônia state in western Brazil

Other uses
 Anari cheese, a Cypriot cheese
 Anari (musician) (born 1970), Basque musician